Unity is a  tall bronze sculpture of an arm, hand, and pointing index finger by Hank Willis Thomas, installed in Brooklyn, New York City. The artwork was unveiled in 2019.

References

2019 establishments in New York City
2019 sculptures
2010s in Brooklyn
Bronze sculptures in Brooklyn
Colossal statues in the United States
Downtown Brooklyn
Hank Willis Thomas
Outdoor sculptures in Brooklyn